A direct service organisation or direct labour organisation (DSO or DLO) is a business unit of a United Kingdom local authority or housing association  which undertakes work specified by the Local Government Act 1988 and Local Government, Planning and Land Act 1980 and/or other work, including construction and maintenance. Its workers are directly employed by the authority.

Formation 
Compulsory competitive tendering and deregulation were encouraged in the early 1980s, leading to the formal establishment of the DSO (and its forerunner, the DLO).

References 

Local government in the United Kingdom
Construction industry of the United Kingdom